Luis Carlos Asprilla Mosquera (born July 1, 1976 Colombia) is a Colombian former football player.

External links
http://archivo.elgrafico.com/index.php?jgd=602

1977 births
Living people
Association football defenders
Colombian footballers
Deportivo Cali footballers
Deportivo Pereira footballers
Club Atlético Huracán footballers
A.D. Isidro Metapán footballers
Atlético Balboa footballers
San Salvador F.C. footballers
Deportivo Pasto footballers
Club Atlético Temperley footballers
Once Municipal footballers
Categoría Primera A players
Expatriate footballers in Argentina
Expatriate footballers in Bolivia
Expatriate footballers in Portugal
Expatriate footballers in El Salvador
Expatriate footballers in Venezuela
Unión Tarija players
Sportspeople from Chocó Department